Agartala railway station is located  from Agartala in Tripura, India. It is the second capital city (after Guwahati, Assam) in northeast India to be connected to the country's railway map, moreover Agartala is the first state capital of independent India to be connected with a rail network. Before 2015 the  route was connected to Lumding with a metre-gauge track, but after the gauge conversion to broad gauge in 2016, the track is connected directly to Guwahati and the rest of India.

From Agartala an under-construction track has been on the way for a connection towards the extreme Southern end point of the state at Sabroom, which has been completed on 3 October 2019. The total length of track from the capital towards the North region's last station is approx. , after which the territory of Assam starts. There are a lot of transportation modes available to reach the city from the station.

History 
The northeastern state capital came on India's railmap with the advent of the railways in the subcontinent in 1853. The foundation stone of the  Kumarghat–Agartala railway project was laid in 1996 by the former Prime Minister H. D. Deve Gowda, and during the laying of rail lines, provisions were kept for swiftly converting it to broad gauge. 40 years time was taken by the Government since then to connect Agartala by rail.

Construction
According to Tripura Chief Minister Manik Sarkar, the NFR had "spent Rs 900 crore ($190 million) to connect Agartala by rail by making three tunnels through the Longtharai Valley, Baramura and Atharamura Hills in Dhalai and West Tripura districts. The  Longtharai tunnel is the longest railway tunnel in eastern India." The architecture of the station resembles Ujjayanta Palace.

Broad-gauge
Agartala was scheduled to get broad-gauge facility by March 2016. Works for conversion in BG from a small metre-gauge track from Lumding to Silchar in Assam was completed in March 2015 Freight services to Agartala had already resumed by then.
It was 31 July 2016 when Suresh Prabhu the then Railway Minister of India inaugurated the Agartala–New Delhi ‘Tripura Sundari Express’, linking the broad gauge with the rest of India. On 28 October 2017 Rajdhani Express was inaugurated from Agartala to Anand Vihar Terminal.

Link with Bangladesh
Government of Bangladesh and Government of India signed a Memorandum of Understanding (MoU) on 21 May 2013 for linking Agartala and Akhaura railway stations to connect Bangladesh Railway with the northeastern states. The total length of the track will be 15.054 km, of which only 5 km falls on the Indian side with the remaining track in Bangladesh. The tracks would be laid in metre gauge on broad-gauge format so that it could be converted into broad gauge when necessary.
The project is funded by India and is expected to cost around Rs 271 crore.

References

External links
 North East Frontier Railways Website

Railway stations in West Tripura district
Buildings and structures in Agartala
Railway stations opened in 2008
Lumding railway division
Transport in Agartala